Kosovo is a village in Shumen Province, Bulgaria, located at .

References 

Villages in Shumen Province